Varrelbusch Airport  is a regional airport in Germany.  It supports general aviation with no commercial airline service scheduled.

History
During World War II, the airport was used by the British Royal Air Force as Advanced Landing Ground B-113 Varrelbusch Airport.

References

 Johnson, David C. (1988), U.S. Army Air Forces Continental Airfields (ETO), D-Day to V-E Day; Research Division, USAF Historical Research Center, Maxwell AFB, Alabama.

External links

Airports in Lower Saxony
Cloppenburg (district)